Esperan may refer to:
 Esperantido
 Esperan Rural District, in Iran